Chromiec  is a village in the administrative district of Gmina Stara Kamienica, within Jelenia Góra County, Lower Silesian Voivodeship, in south-western Poland.

References

Chromiec